BE8 or BE-8 may refer to:
 Beryllium-8 (Be-8 or 8Be), an isotope of beryllium
 Brazilian destroyer escort Bocaina (BE-8), formerly USS Marts
 Beriev Be-8, a 1947 Soviet aircraft
 An endianness mode for the ARM architecture
 The index number for The Nose Book in the Beginner Books collection